The 2007 Vuelta a Andalucía was the 53rd edition of the Vuelta a Andalucía cycle race and was held on 18 February to 22 February 2007. The race started in Otura and finished in Antequera. The race was won by Óscar Freire.

Teams
Fifteen teams of seven riders started the race:

General classification

References

Vuelta a Andalucia
Vuelta a Andalucía by year
2007 in Spanish sport